Ptychatractidae is a taxonomic family of sea snails, marine gastropod mollusks in the superfamily Turbinelloidea.

Taxonomy 
According to the taxonomy of the Gastropoda by Bouchet & Rocroi (2005), the family Ptychatractidae has no subfamilies.

Genera 
Genera in the family Ptychatractidae include:
 Egestas Finlay, 1926
 Exilia Conrad, 1860
 Exilioidea Grant & Gale, 1931
 Metzgeria Norman, 1879
 Ptychatractus Stimpson, 1865

 Latiromitra Locard, 1897 - In 2010 Latiromitra has been found to be closely related to Costellariidae in the molecular phylogeny analysis by Fedosov & Kantor (2010).

Genera brought into synonymy
 Benthovoluta Kuroda & Habe, 1950: synonym of Exilia Conrad, 1860
 Chathamidia Dell, 1956: synonym of Exilia Conrad, 1860
 Cyomesus Quinn, 1981: synonym of Latiromitra Locard, 1897
 † Graphidula Stephenson, 1941: synonym of Exilia Conrad, 1860
 Meyeria Dunker & Metzger, 1874: synonym of Metzgeria Norman, 1879
 Mitraefusus Bellardi, 1873: synonym of Exilia Conrad, 1860
 Okinawavoluta Noda, 1980: synonym of Latiromitra Locard, 1897
 † Palaeorhaphis Stewart, 1927 : synonym of Exilia Conrad, 1860
 Phenacoptygma Dall, 1918: synonym of Exilia Conrad, 1860
 Surculina Dall, 1908: synonym of Exilia Conrad, 1860
 † Zexilia Finlay, 1926 : synonym of Exilia Conrad, 1860

References

External links
 Stimpson W. 1865. On certain genera and families of zoophagous gasteropods. American Journal of Conchology, 1: 55-64, pl. 8-9